Uniopolis is an unincorporated community and former village in Auglaize County, Ohio, United States. The population was 222 at the 2010 census. It is included in the Wapakoneta, Ohio Micropolitan Statistical Area. 

The community is served by the Wapakoneta City School District.

History
Uniopolis was founded in 1837 and incorporated in 1900.  In 2013, voters chose to disincorporate Uniopolis into Union Township.

Its village hall, now a museum, is listed on the National Register of Historic Places.

Geography
Uniopolis is located at  (40.601985, -84.086537).

Demographics

2010 census
As of the census of 2010, there were 222 people, 83 households, and 64 families living in the village. The racial makeup of the village was 100.0% White.

There were 83 households, of which 27.7% had children under the age of 18 living with them, 65.1% were married couples living together, 7.2% had a female householder with no husband present, 4.8% had a male householder with no wife present, and 22.9% were non-families. 16.9% of all households were made up of individuals, and 3.6% had someone living alone who was 65 years of age or older. The average household size was 2.67 and the average family size was 2.97.

The median age in the village was 41.5 years. 18.9% of residents were under the age of 18; 11.4% were between the ages of 18 and 24; 24% were from 25 to 44; 28.5% were from 45 to 64; and 17.6% were 65 years of age or older. The gender makeup of the village was 52.3% male and 47.7% female.

2000 census
As of the census of 2000, there were 256 people, 88 households, and 77 families living in the village. The population density was 1,640.3 people per square mile (617.8/km). There were 93 housing units at an average density of 595.9 per square mile (224.4/km). The racial makeup of the village was 98.83% White, 0.39% African American, 0.39% Native American, and 0.39% from two or more races. Hispanic or Latino of any race were 1.17% of the population.

There were 88 households, out of which 44.3% had children under the age of 18 living with them, 71.6% were married couples living together, 10.2% had a female householder with no husband present, and 12.5% were non-families. 10.2% of all households were made up of individuals, and 3.4% had someone living alone who was 65 years of age or older. The average household size was 2.91 and the average family size was 3.08.

In the village the population was spread out, with 30.1% under the age of 18, 8.2% from 18 to 24, 31.6% from 25 to 44, 18.8% from 45 to 64, and 11.3% who were 65 years of age or older. The median age was 33 years. For every 100 females, there were 113.3 males. For every 100 females age 18 and over, there were 113.1 males.

The median income for a household in the village was $37,083, and the median income for a family was $38,750. Males had a median income of $30,909 versus $24,375 for females. The per capita income for the village was $16,099. None of the population or families were below the poverty line.

References

Unincorporated communities in Auglaize County, Ohio
Populated places established in 1837
1837 establishments in Ohio
2013 disestablishments in Ohio
Populated places disestablished in 2013
Former municipalities in Ohio
Unincorporated communities in Ohio